W. Dale Warren is an American-born conductor. He is the senior Wind band director at the University of Arkansas and the professor of Music.

Early life

He was born in Greenville, Kentucky, United States. He attended Muhlenberg Central High School where he played the euphonium in the band under the director Joe Allen. Warren received his bachelor's degree in music education from Austin Peay State University. W. Dale Warren received his masters of Music Education from University of Kentucky.

Career
Professor Warren worked at Bremen High School in Bremen, Kentucky (1980-1982) and at North Hardin High School in Radcliff, Kentucky (1982-1986). Warren was also the Associate band director at the University of Kentucky (1986-1991). Former University of Arkansas Razorback Marching band (1991-2000). Current senior wind band director at the University of Arkansas.

Honors
Professor Warren has six guest appearances with the UA wind symphony at College Band Directors National Association. In 2000 the University of Arkansas performed at Carnegie Hall in New York City. During Warren's tenure as the director of the University of Arkansas Razorback Marching Band performed for President Bill Clinton multiple times and performed as the Grand Finale Band St. Patrick's Day Parade in Dublin, Ireland.

Other affiliations
National Band Association
Phi Beta Mu Bandmasters Fraternity
Music Educators National conference
College Band Directors National Association
World Association of Symphonic Bands and Ensembles
Conductors Guild
Arkansas Bandmasters Association
Arkansas Music Educators Association
Arkansas School Band and Orchestra Association
Phi Mu Alpha Sinfonia
Kappa Kappa Psi
Tau Beta Sigma
Pi Kappa Lambda

References

Living people
American male conductors (music)
People from Greenville, Kentucky
Austin Peay State University alumni
University of Kentucky alumni
Musicians from Kentucky
21st-century American conductors (music)
21st-century American male musicians
Year of birth missing (living people)